Milton Edward Schwarzwald (1891–1950) was a film director and musical theater composer and producer. In the 1930s, he directed numerous Mentone Productions comedy musical variety films before departing to produce musical theater in 1939.

Leo Feist published sheet music for his operetta Flora Bella in 1916. He and Arthur Francis collaborated on a 1922 musical score.

Playbill and IBDB list him as the musical director of four theatrical productions in the 1920s and as a musical contributor to a couple more.

BFI credits him with the music for five films in 1949 and 1950.

His son Arnold Schwarzwald was a composer and soundman.

Filmography
Revue à la Carte (1935)
Gus Van's Music Shoppe (1935), director
Gus Van's Garden Party (1936), director
 Musical Airwaves (1936), director of the 10-minute short for Universal Pictures
Maids and Music (1938), producer
Rumba Rhythms (1942), musical director
Top Man (film) (1943), producer
Girl on the Spot (1945), executive producer
Johnny Stool Pigeon (1949), composer
Illegal Entry (1949), music
The Pecos Pistol (1949), composer
The Story of Molly X (1949), composer
Ma and Pa Kettle Go to Town (1950), composer
The Kid from Texas (1950), musical director
I Was a Shoplifter (1950), music director
Outside the Wall (1950), music director
Woman in Hiding (1950), music director

Discography
Baby Vampire, sheet music, composer

References

External links
Discogs catalog

American film directors